Michael Martin may refer to:

Entertainment
 Michael Martin (poker player), American professional poker player
 Michael Martin (Neighbours), fictional character on the Australian soap opera Neighbours
 T. Michael Martin (born 1984), American author and YouTube vlogger
 Michael Martin (1958–2009), given name of graffiti artist IZ the Wiz
 Michael Martin, singer in the country band Marshall Dyllon
 Michael Martin (born 1982), creator of the controversial YouTube channel FamilyOFive

Politics
 Michael S. Martin (politician) (born 1938), Canadian politician
 Michael Martin, Baron Martin of Springburn (1945–2018), speaker of the House of Commons in the United Kingdom
 Micheál Martin (born 1960), Irish politician and Tánaiste

Sports
 Michael Martin (cricketer) (1926–2011), English cricketer
 Michael Martin (Australian footballer) (born 1977), Australian rules footballer
 Michael Martin (footballer, born 1998), Caymanian footballer
 Micheál Martin (Gaelic footballer) (born 1994), Irish Gaelic footballer
 Mick Martin (born 1951), Irish soccer player

Other
 Michael Lou Martin (1932–2015), American philosopher
 Michael G. F. Martin (born 1962), British professor of philosophy
 Michael Martin (engineer), British bridge engineer
 Michael E. Martin, United States Air Force general
 Michael S. Martin (general), United States Marine Corps general

See also
 Michael Martyn (disambiguation)
 Mike Martin (disambiguation)
 Michael Craig-Martin (born 1941), Irish conceptual artist and painter
 Michel Martin, American journalist
 Harold Martin (RAF officer) (1918–1988), known as Micky, Australian bomber pilot